Phi Chi is one of the oldest and largest international medical fraternities of its kind in the world. Phi Chi evolved from the merging of two professional medical fraternities bearing the same name. Phi Chi Society (Phi Chi East) was founded on March 31, 1889, at the University of Vermont, Burlington, Vt. Phi Chi Medical Fraternity (Phi Chi South) was founded on October 26, 1894, at the Louisville Medical College, Louisville, Ky. These two organizations did not know that they shared a similar name when they were founded. On March 5, 1905, in Burlington, Vt., Phi Chi Society and Phi Chi Medical Fraternity, Inc., were consolidated taking the name Phi Chi Medical Fraternity, Inc.

Chapters from the following Medical Societies have merged with Phi Chi over the years:

Original Consolidation

Later merger participants

When the Phi Chi Society and Phi Chi Medical Fraternity combined in 1905, it was decided that when the names of any two chapters conflicted, the chapter with precedence would retain its single letter name and the chapter following shall duplicate its name. The result was to retain Alpha chapter (1889) at the University of Vermont, and name the former Alpha chapter  of Louisville (1894) as Alpha Alpha chapter.

References
 
 
 
 
 

Phi Chi
Phi Chi Medical Fraternity